Halloween Wars is an American reality competition series that premiered on October 2, 2011 on cable television network Food Network. The show has several teams of three (a cake sculptor, a sugar artist, and a pumpkin carver) that compete to create a Halloween themed display. The last trio standing is awarded $50,000

Series overview

Season 1 (2011)

Teams 
Team Tarantula - Susan Notter (sugar), Andrea Carusetta (cake), Michael Natiello (pumpkin)

Bling Bats - Karen Portaleo (cake), Julie Bashore (sugar), Shawn Feeney (pumpkin)

Team Boo! - Ray Villafane (pumpkin), Andrea Reed (cake), Jansen Chan (sugar)

Skulls of the Abyss - Cory Hansen (cake), Chris Maniac (pumpkin), Louise Chien (sugar)

Something Wicked - Pam Leno (pumpkin), Ruby Carlsruh (sugar), Becky Rink (cake)

Episodes

Season 2 (2012)

Teams 
No Guts No Gory - Gonzuela Bastarache (cake), Doug Goodreau (pumpkin), Dana Herbert (sugar)

Dead Men Walking - Marc Maniac (pumpkin), Richard Ruskell (sugar), Vinny Garcia (cake)

Paranormal - Ruby Carlsruh (sugar), Ray Brown (pumpkin), Leigh Henderson (cake)

Morbid Mayhem - Andy Bergholtz (pumpkin), Peggy Tucker (sugar), Barbara Garrard (cake)

Screamish - Charity George (cake), Dean Murray (pumpkin), Darci Rochau (sugar)

Episodes

Season 3 (2013)

Teams 
Twisted Trio - Veronique de Groot (cake), Robert Childers (pumpkin), Heather Hurlbert (sugar)

Black Magic - Jeff Ontiveros (sugar), Sarah Ono Jones (cake), Gabriel Viñas (pumpkin)

Skeleton Crew - Jon Neill (pumpkin), Mark Lie (cake), Santosh Tiptur (sugar)

Psychotic Misfits - Brian Stevens (cake), Dave Smith (pumpkin), Teresa Shurilla (sugar)

Crypt Creepers - Sue Beatrice (pumpkin), Robert Lombardi (sugar), Benny Rivera (cake)

Episodes

Season 4 (2014)

Teams 
Corpse Crushers - Jon Neill (pumpkin), Kyle Miller (cake), Briea Nathan (sugar)

Dead Reckoning - Jonathan Barwood (pumpkin), Mary Moy (sugar), Leigh Henderson (cake)

Sweet Nightmares - Robert Lombardi (sugar), Gonzuela Bastarache (cake), Cassie Wollen (pumpkin)

Malicious Intent - Teresa Shurilla (sugar), Danny Lane (cake), Ray Brown (pumpkin)

Spooktacular - Benny Rivera (cake), Rebecca Millican (sugar), Danny Kissel (pumpkin)

Episodes

Season 5 (2015)

Teams 
Scream Team - Adam Bierton (pumpkin), Robert Teddy (cake), Darci Rochau (sugar)

Gore Mayhem - Heidi Trelstad (cake), Rocio Varela (sugar), Dean Murray (pumpkin)

Morbid Morticians - Rebecca Wortman (sugar), Renay Zamora (cake), Doug Goodreau (pumpkin)

2 Ghouls and a Guy - Diane Fehder (cake), Jeff Munchell (sugar), Bridget McCarty (pumpkin)

Spell Binders - Joseph Yakovetic (pumpkin), Charity George (sugar), Kristen Lovulla (cake)

Episodes

Season 6 (2016)

Teams 
Crypt Cookers - Teresa Argeris (sugar), Jason Reaves (cake), Lenny Calvin (pumpkin)

Sugar Psychos - Al DiBartolo (cake), Santosh Tiptur (sugar), James Hall (pumpkin)

Food Phantoms - Ray Brown (pumpkin), Chris Davies (sugar), Kimberly Hall (cake)

Scare Squad - Gus Smithhisler (pumpkin), Darmayne Robertson (cake), Joshua Simpson (sugar)

The Underbakers - Jewel Johnson (sugar), Erin Erler (cake), Jeremy Smith (pumpkin)

Sweet Screams - Angela Sweetser (sugar), Tersey Bolin (cake), Chad Gainey (pumpkin)

Episodes

Season 7 (2017)

Teams 

Morbid Masterminds - Mike Elder (cake), Shannon Gerasimchik (pumpkin), Charity George (sugar)

Sugar Slashers - Brian "Tator" Edwards (pumpkin), Johanna Wyss (cake), Michelle Boyd (sugar)

Scare Snactics - Briea Nathan (sugar), Sam Slade (cake), Mike Craghead (pumpkin)

Team Ghoul'd - Liz Marek (cake), Mike Brown (pumpkin), Christophe Rull (sugar)

Ghoulish Gang - Nancy Baker (pumpkin), Rachael Morris (cake), Nils Rowland (sugar)

Spooky Boo's - Vivian Pham (cake), Danielle DeJesus (pumpkin), Kara Andretta (sugar)

Episodes

Season 8 (2018)

Teams 

Grave Expectations - Elizabeth Rowe (cake), Jewel Johnson (sugar), Clive Cooper (pumpkin)

Tricked-Out-Treats - Brandy Davis (pumpkin), Ernest Strickland (cake), Teresa Shurilla (sugar)

Monsters of Mayhem - Jeff Brown (pumpkin), Sabrina Jurado (cake), Cesar Barachina (sugar)

Zesty Zombies - Kimberly Hall (cake), Lenny Calvin (pumpkin), Shelby Bower (sugar)

Candied Cadavers - Cynthia White (cake), Orly Yadao (sugar), Arlen Pelletier (pumpkin)

Beastly Banshees - Corinna MacGuire (cake), Tom Lindskog (pumpkin), Joshua Simpson (sugar)

Episodes

Season 9 (2019)

Teams 
Trio of Terror - Brian "Tator" Edwards (pumpkin), Kristen Eagles (cake), Fred "Froggy" Isla (sugar)

Hangry Haunters - Jarid Altmark (cake), Rebecca Millican (sugar), Mike Brown (pumpkin)

Malicious Mavens - Lisa Barker (pumpkin), Haley Popp (cake), Kelsee Newman (sugar)

Burned at the Cake - Brenda Villacorta (cake), Julian Jimenez (sugar), Chris Larsen (pumpkin)

Buttercream Beasts - Beth Townsend (cake), Matt Harper (pumpkin), Angela Sweetser (sugar)

Frosted Freakshow - Christine Leaming (cake), James Hall (pumpkin), Reva Alexander-Hawk (sugar)

: Fred "Froggy" Isla (Team Trio of Terror) was part of the team with the most wins on Halloween Wars: Hayride of Horror (Team  Scream Seekers). Their team won $30,000.

: Reva Alexander-Hawk (Team Frosted Freakshow) was part of the team with the least wins on Halloween Wars: Hayride of Horror (Team  Deadly Intentions). Their team won $15,000.

Episodes

Season 10 (2020)

Teams 
Candy Coroners - Amy McBride (cake), Chad Gainey (pumpkin), Janet Barron (sugar)

Ghoulicious - Heather Sherman (cake), Deane Arnold (pumpkin), Cesar Barachina (sugar)

Mummies' Rejects - Daniel Miller (pumpkin), Haymu Basu (cake), Steve Weiss (sugar)

Ghouly Goblins - Stephan Baity (pumpkin), Sam Lucero (cake), Sharon Hauht (sugar)

Crave Diggers - Jeff Taylor (cake), Eric Jones (pumpkin), Joel Gonzalez (sugar)

Killer Cakerz - Carmel Turner (cake), Vanessa Greeley (sugar), Jim Bille (pumpkin)

Episodes

Special (2017)

Halloween Wars: Hayride of Horror 

In 2017, a special three-part competition aired in addition to the usual Halloween Wars series, with the heading "Hayride of Horror". Two five-person teams battle head to head in a three episode event where they have a chance to win up to $45,000 ($15,000 each episode); there are no eliminations. Each team has three pumpkin carvers, a cake baker, and a sugar artist. Following a similar round format as "Halloween Wars", they make a small set piece in the first round (called the "First Shock") to get an advantage in the main challenge (called the "Final Fright"); first pick of the pumpkin patch. Both teams get two assistants in the second, main round.

The teams work outside, in an actual farm, and their displays are put out on the trail where dozens of hayriders will ride through, try some special treats, and choose the winning set piece. Each episode, a winning team gets $15,000. Harley Morenstein serves as the host. Zac Young (pastry chef) and Bianca Appice (SFX make-up artist) are the two judges.

Teams 

Deadly Intentions: Adam Bierton (pumpkin), Reva Alexander-Hawk (sugar), Stephan Baity (pumpkin),  Monique Hawk (pumpkin), Mark Lie (cake)

Scream Seekers: Danny Kissel (pumpkin), Fred "Froggy" Isla (sugar), Jewel Burgess (cake), Dave Smith (pumpkin), Frank Reaver (pumpkin)

Episodes

References

External links 
 Halloween Wars episode guide
 Halloween Wars on IMDB

2010s American cooking television series
2011 American television series debuts
Food Network original programming